This was a new event in 2012.

Timea Bacsinszky and Caroline Garcia won the title defeating Yang Zhaoxuan and Zhao Yijing in the final 7–5, 6–3.

Seeds

Draw

Draw

References
 Main Draw

ITF Women's Circuit - Suzhou - Doubles
Suzhou Ladies Open